Finn Henriksen (29 January 1933 – 6 December 2008) was a Danish film director and screenwriter. He directed 17 films and wrote for 19 between 1960 and 1989. He was born in Randers, Denmark and died in Lyngby, Denmark. He is buried at Lundtofte Cemetery.

Filmography

 Jydekompagniet 3 (1989)
 Jydekompagniet (1988)
 Fængslende feriedage (1978)
 Piger til søs (1977)
 Julefrokosten (1976)
 Piger i trøjen 2 (1976)
 Piger i trøjen (1975)
 Pigen og drømmeslottet (1974)
 Helle for Lykke (1969)
 Far laver sovsen (1967)
 Pigen og greven (1966)
 Flådens friske fyre (1965)
 Norden i flammer (1965)
 Bussen (1963)
 Frøken April (1963)
 Prinsesse for en dag (1962)
 Forelsket i København (1960)

External links

1933 births
2008 deaths
Danish film directors
Danish male screenwriters
People from Randers
20th-century screenwriters